Ceryx formicina is a moth of the subfamily Arctiinae. It was described by Charles Swinhoe in 1892. It is found on New Guinea.

References

Ceryx (moth)
Moths described in 1892